Kalateh-ye Shahab (also Romanized as Kalāteh-ye Shahāb; also known as Mazra‘eh-ye Shahāb and Dar Sūqeh) is a village in Zibad Rural District, Kakhk District, Gonabad County, Razavi Khorasan Province, Iran. At the 2006 census, its population was 43, in 14 families.

References 

Populated places in Gonabad County